Dubrimakhi (Dargwa: Дубримахьи) is a rural locality (a selo) and the administrative centre of Dubrimakhinsky Selsoviet, Akushinsky District, Republic of Dagestan, Russia. The population was 690 as of 2010.

Geography 
Dubrimakhi is located 8 km west of Akusha (the district's administrative centre) by road. Burgimakhi is the nearest rural locality.

References 

Rural localities in Akushinsky District